Panagiotis Efstratiadis (1815–1888) was a Greek archaeologist. He served as Ephor General of Antiquities between 1864 and 1884, succeeding Kyriakos Pittakis.

Efstratiadis is mostly remembered for his efforts to protect Greece's archaeological heritage, particularly on the Acropolis of Athens. He is also significant for his patronage of Panagiotis Stamatakis, who succeeded him as Ephor General and whom he appointed to oversee the excavations of Heinrich Schliemann at Mycenae.

Early life and career (1815-1864) 

Efstratiadis was born on Lesbos in 1815. He studied at the University of Athens under Ludwig Ross, the former Ephor General, and later received a government scholarship to study Classical philology at the Humboldt University of Berlin, where one of his teachers was August Boeck, the compiler of the Corpus Inscriptionum Graecarum.

Efstratiadis was a founding member of the Archaeological Society of Athens, which had significant responsibility for archaeological work and heritage management in Greece throughout the 19th century. The Society was formed in 1837, largely through the initiative of Pittakis, the wealthy merchant Konstantinos Bellios, the poet Alexandros Rizos Rangavis (who became its first secretary) and the Minister for Education Iakovos Rizos Neroulos, who became its first president. The Society held its first meeting on 28 April 1837, in the Parthenon. 

In 1851, following the resignation of Rangavis, the Archaeological Society stagnated, having largely run out of money. Efstratiadis became one of Society's few remaining employees, serving as vice-secretary and as a member of the board.

Efstratiadis was also a founding member in 1848 of the short-lived Archaeological Association, established by Rangavis as a national academy for Greek science and culture. The Society's first publication was accompanied by a letter in Ancient Greek written by Efstratiadis, extolling the contribution of Greeks to the study of the humanities and the role of modern Greeks in communicating epigraphical knowledge to the wider European world. In 1849, Efstratiadis wrote the Ancient Greek text of the 'Decree of the Benefactors', a pseudo-Classical stele erected by the Society to honour those who had contributed financially to it. Nikolaos Papazarkadas has described the stele as 'one of the earliest attempts at integrating, however awkwardly, epigraphical knowledge in contemporary cultural practices.' 

The collapse of the Archaeological Association in 1854 drew members back to the Archaeological Society, which renewed its activities from 1858, largely thanks to the inspiration of Stefanos Koumanoudis. Efstratiadis joined the Society's Council in that year, serving until 1883.

Between 1861 and 1867, he conducted excavations in the Theatre of Dionysus, near the Acropolis of Athens.

His published scholarly output was limited, consisting largely of fifteen articles in the Archaeological Journal, though studies of his notebooks and papers in the 21st century have revealed important, unpublished inscriptions.

Ephor General of Antiquities (1864-1884) 

After the death of Pittakis in 1863, Efstratiadis succeeded him as Ephor General of Antiquities, the highest office of the Greek Archaeological Service. In this capacity, one of his major responsibilities was the curation and protection of monuments on the Acropolis of Athens. His tenure saw the controversial demolition in 1874 of the Frankish Tower at the Propylaia, which the Archaeological Society defended as a means of 'the restoration of the Greek character of the shining face of the Acropolis, pure and unsullied by anything foreign'. Other major projects of his period as Ephor General included the construction of the first archaeological museum in Athens, between 1865 and 1874. The building necessitated excavations in the northern and north-eastern parts of the Acropolis: excavations here of the so-called Perserschutt (the ceremonial dump into which the Athenians had placed the remains of the Persian destruction of the Acropolis in 480 BCE) brought to light significant works of ancient sculpture. He also oversaw the construction of the Central Museum, later the National Archaeological Museum, under the architect Panagis Kalkos.
During this period, he maintained a daybook of excavations and events on the Acropolis, which testifies to his struggles with profiteering by those buying the stone blocks taken from the Frankish Tower, with complaints from local residents that unstable piles of spoil from the excavations were endangering their homes, and with looting of antiquities, as well as the challenges of protecting objects and monuments from weathering once they had been exposed to the elements. He carried out excavations of the Stoa of Eumenes between 1864 and 1865. 

In July 1866, he hired Panagiotis Stamatakis, then aged around twenty and with no formal archaeological education, as his personal assistant. In 1874, when Heinrich Schliemann was granted permission by the Greek government to excavate at Mycenae, Efstratiadis insisted that Stamatakis should accompany the excavations as the state's overseer and representative. Efstratiadis was highly suspicious of Schliemann, and remained in continuous contact with Stamatakis by letter throughout the excavations, which eventually took place in 1876. 

Efstratiadis' handling of Schliemann's case mirrored his earlier treatment, in January 1866, of the art dealers Grigorios Bournias and Ioannis Palaiologos, who had asked permission to excavate in the Prophitis Ilias area of Athens: while Eustratiades noted that the law obliged him to grant permission, as the excavation was on private land and the landowner's consent had been given, he insisted that the excavation should take place under strict supervision. Efstratiadis also opposed the removal of antiquities from Greece: in 1867, he denounced the epigrapher  for selling the so-called 'Aineta aryballos' to the British Museum, calling him a 'university professor, antiquities looter'. However, he was restricted by the need to retain good relations with the art dealers of Athens, who undertook more excavations in this period than either the Archaeological Society or the Archaeological Service and usually offered to sell the artefacts they uncovered to the state, and by the limited legal powers available to respond to the illegal export of antiquities. In 1873, for example, he noted in his records the illegal export by the art dealer Anastasios Erneris of a series of funerary plaques, painted by Exekias, to the German archaeologist Gustav Hirschfeld, but was unable to prevent or reverse the sale. Yannis Galanakis has judged that the limited financial and legal resources available to Efstratiadis, as well as the lack of political will to assist him on the part of the Greek state, meant that his goal of controlling the illegal excavation and trade of antiquities was 'impossible to achieve'. 

In an era when few Greek archaeologists worked outside Athens, Efstratiadis took an interest in antiquities throughout Greece: during 1869–1870, he took particular interest in the excavation of inscriptions on Euboea, not only following his legal duties as Ephor General in instructing the local prefect and government as to their excavation and conservation, but writing directly to local scholars, mayors and police officers, asking their help in conducting rescue excavations and in locating finds, protecting them from looting, and transporting them back to Athens. His handwriting from this period has been described as 'hasty, nervous and illegible, and as indicative of the strain that Efstratiadis' intense workload placed upon him.

Efstratiadis' tenure as Ephor General saw the foundation of the German Archaeological Institute at Athens in 1874 and its first excavations at Olympia from 1875–1881, as well as the beginnings of the excavation of Eleusis in 1882. He also oversaw the beginning of the expansion of the Archaeological Service (previously largely staffed by the Ephor General himself, along with occasional assistants): in 1879, Panagiotis Kavvadias was recruited as an ephor, followed by Konstantinos Dimitriadis in 1881 and by five further appointments in 1883 and 1885, including those of Christos Tsountas and Valerios Stais. This expansion continued throughout the next two decades, providing the core of the service's 20th-century administrative apparatus.

Efstratiadis retired as Ephor General in 1884, and was succeeded by his protégé Stamatakis. He died in Athens in 1888.

Other work, honours and personal life 

Until 1863, Efstratiadis worked as a teacher: first in Nafplio, and later as headmaster of a secondary school (gymnasium) in Athens. He was a corresponding member of the Academy of Sciences in Berlin, and was awarded the silver cross of the Greek Order of the Redeemer.

Little is known of his private and family life, except the name of his son, Michael, who became a lawyer and donated a cache of Panagiotis' papers to the Archaeological Society of Athens in 1932.

In person, Efstratiadis was known to be meticulous, independent and highly protective of the antiquities in his care. He was also introverted and withdrawn: no known image or photograph of him survives. An 1882 letter from Stefanos Koumanoudis, who knew Efstratiadis from his time as a fellow-student in Germany, reveals something of his character:

A conference in Efstratiadis' memory was held at the National Archaeological Museum of Athens in December 2015, hosted by the Greek Epigraphical Society.

References

Bibliography 

 
 
 
 
 
 
 
 
 
 
 
 
 
 
 
 
 
 

1888 deaths
Greek archaeologists
19th-century archaeologists
People from Lesbos
1815 births
Ephors General of Greece